Miramar Hotel and Investment Company Limited (Miramar Group)  is a group with a diversified service-oriented business portfolio comprising hotels and serviced apartments, property rental, food and beverage, and travel services in Hong Kong and Mainland China. Miramar Group has been listed on the Hong Kong Stock Exchange since 1970 (HKEx Stock Code: 71) and is a member of Henderson Land Group.

History
The group was founded in 1957 by Mr. Young Chi Wan after taking over the Spanish Catholic Missions-owned hotel property on Nathan Road, Kowloon, Hong Kong. It was listed on the Hong Kong Stock Exchange in 1970. It was also a member of Hang Seng Index Constituent Stocks (blue-chip stocks) from 1974 to 1996. In 1993, it was acquired by Henderson Investment, a subsidiary of Henderson Land Development.

See also
 The Mira Hong Kong
 Miramar Shopping Centre

References

Conglomerate companies established in 1957
Companies listed on the Hong Kong Stock Exchange
Conglomerate companies of China
Former companies in the Hang Seng Index
Henderson Land Development
Conglomerate companies of Hong Kong
Hospitality companies of Hong Kong
1957 establishments in Hong Kong